The Golden Lotus Award for Best Cinematography is a Golden Lotus Award awarded each year to a cinematographer for work in one particular motion picture.

Award winners and nominees

2000s

2009 (1st)

2010s

2010 (2nd)

2011 (3rd)

2012 (4th)

2013 (5th)

2014 (6th)

2015 (7th)

2016 (8th)

2016 (8th)

2017 (9th)

References

External links

Golden Lotus Awards
Awards established in 2009
2009 establishments in Macau
Awards for best cinematography